Anastasia Khitruk (born August 1974, in Moscow) is a Russian-born American violin player. She was a student of Dorothy DeLay at the Juilliard School. She has made many recordings of which three were for Naxos: Khandoshkin #8.570028, Grammy nominated Miklos Rozsa Violin Concerto #8.570350, and Leon de Saint-Lubin #8.572019.  Several works written for Ms. Khitruk include Der Golum by Michael Colina.

She  was born to piano players Andrey Khitruk and Elena Tatulyan. She is a granddaughter of the animator Fyodor Khitruk.

References

Russian musicians
Russian women musicians
Juilliard School alumni
Living people
21st-century violinists
21st-century women musicians
Women classical violinists
1974 births